Any vector space can be made into a unital associative algebra, called functional-theoretic algebra,  by defining products in terms of two linear functionals. In general, it is a non-commutative algebra. It becomes commutative when the two functionals are the same.

Definition
Let AF be a vector space over a field F, and let L1 and L2 be two linear functionals on AF with the property L1(e) = L2(e) = 1F  for some e in AF. We define multiplication of two elements x, y in AF  by

It can be verified that the above multiplication is associative and that e is the identity of this multiplication. 

So, AF forms an associative algebra with unit e and is called a functional theoretic algebra(FTA).

Suppose the two linear functionals L1 and L2 are the same, say L. Then AF becomes a commutative algebra with multiplication defined by

Example
X is a nonempty set and F a field. FX is the set of functions from X  to F.

If f, g are in FX, x in X and α  in F, then define 

and 

With addition and scalar multiplication defined as this, FX is a vector space over F.

Now, fix two elements a, b in X and define a function e from X to F by e(x) = 1F for all x in X. 

Define L1 and L2 from FX to F by L1(f) = f(a) and L2(f) = f(b).  

Then L1 and L2 are two linear functionals on FX such that L1(e)= L2(e)= 1F
For f, g in FX define 

Then FX becomes a non-commutative function algebra with the function e as the identity of multiplication.

Note that

FTA of Curves in the Complex Plane
Let C denote the field of
Complex numbers. 
A continuous function γ from the closed
interval [0, 1] of real numbers to the field C is called a
curve. The complex numbers γ(0) and γ(1) are, respectively,
the initial and terminal points of the curve. 
If they coincide, the
curve is called a loop. 
The set V[0, 1] of all the curves is a
vector space over C.

We can make this vector space of curves into an
algebra by defining multiplication as above.
Choosing  we have for  α,β in C[0, 1],

Then, V[0, 1] is a non-commutative algebra with e as the unity.

We illustrate
this with an example.

Example of f-Product of Curves
Let us take (1) the line segment joining the points (1, 0) and (0, 1) and (2) the unit circle with center at the
origin.
As curves in V[0, 1], their equations can be obtained as 
  

Since  the circle g
is a loop. 
The line segment  f starts from :
and ends at  

Now, we get two f-products
 given by 

 
and

See the Figure.

Observe that  showing that 
multiplication is non-commutative. Also both the products starts from

See also
 N-curve

References

 Sebastian Vattamattam and R. Sivaramakrishnan, A Note on Convolution Algebras, in Recent Trends in Mathematical Analysis, Allied Publishers, 2003.
 Sebastian Vattamattam and R. Sivaramakrishnan, Associative Algebras via Linear Functionals, Proceedings of the Annual Conference of K.M.A., Jan. 17 - 19, 2000, pp. 81-89  
 Sebastian Vattamattam, Non-Commutative Function Algebras, in Bulletin of Kerala Mathematical Association, Vol. 4, No. 2, December 2007 
 Sebastian Vattamattam, Transforming Curves by n-Curving, in Bulletin of Kerala Mathematics Association, Vol. 5, No. 1, December 2008
 Sebastian Vattamattam, Book of Beautiful Curves, January 2015
Book of Beautiful Curves
 R. Sivaramakrishnan, Certain Number Theoretic Episodes in Algebra, Chapman and Hall/CRC
Certain Number Theoretic Episodes in Algebra

Algebras